Orkney Snork Nie was a popular Afrikaans sitcom, originally broadcast by the SABC in South Africa between 1989 and 1992. The name translates directly into Orkney Doesn't Snore, but the message being conveyed in Afrikaans is that the town isn't sleepy, there's always something happening. The series was written and directed by Willie Esterhuizen who was also involved in other popular South African series and movies. The series consists of four seasons, with two movies also produced (see below for more details). , the series was rebroadcast on the Afrikaans DStv channel KykNet.

Plot
The show was based in the mining town of Orkney, near the city of Klerksdorp (and not too far from Johannesburg), and followed the exploits of an Afrikaner family named Van Tonder, a common Afrikaans surname.

The head of the household, Hendrik (played by Zack du Plessis), worked on the mines and his wife, Maggie (Annette Engelbrecht), was a housewife. They had four children (oldest to youngest): Ouboet, Bennie, Hester and Wimpie. Ouboet (Frank Opperman) was a car mechanic. He and his wife, Yolanda (Sally Campher), had a little baby of their own, named Hendrik after his grandfather. "Ouboet" is an Afrikaans term of endearment meaning "older brother", his name really being Neels. Hester (Clara Joubert) and Wimpie (Anrich Herbst) were both at school. The character of Bennie (Charl van Heyningen) was rarely seen as he first was in the army and later left the town of Orkney. Wimpie had an on and off relationship with a girl named Sonja (Carien Wandrag), and his best friend was named Koert (Rinus van Niekerk).

From time to time other family members, such as grandfathers and grandmothers would stay over with the family and cause all sorts of mischief. Later the family also adopted two orphans, a young Afrikaner girl named Riekie (Bernice Du Plessis) and a coloured boy named Neelsie (Eugene Martin).

History
Esterhuizen had played around with the idea since the early 1980s, but the SABC rejected the proposal for five years claiming it was "in bad taste". The series was finally given the go-ahead in 1987, but only after it was laboriously rewritten several times, and even then the SABC held the view that very few Afrikaners would associate with the series.

In May 1989 the first season of 13 episodes was finally broadcast. It was received extremely well, and led to two more seasons, the second being broadcast from August 1990 and the third and final one starting in April 1992.

The success of the TV series, which occupied a top ten spot on ratings for most of its run and held the number one spot for weeks on end, lead to two movies also being produced. Both were extremely successful at the South African box office.

Controversy
Although the series was one of South Africa's best loved and most successful series at the time of its original screening, a small but vocal minority were critical of the show. Some of those opposed to it felt that the show contained too many English words and slang, so harming the Afrikaans language. Another group felt that the presence of Neelsie, the coloured orphan adopted by the family, was inappropriate, an issue arising from South Africa's status as an apartheid state.

Season 1 (1989)
The first season contains a total of 13 episodes which were originally broadcast on  SABC (TV1).

Season 2

Characters

Films
In later years two films were released based on the television sitcom. Many of the same actors were involved in the films, though Ouboet was portrayed by Marcel van Heerden in the first one since Frank Opperman was acting in the lead role of another South African series The Big Time. The films were:

 Orkney Snork Nie (Die Movie), tagline "Dis Lekker By Die See" (translation: It's Fun At The Sea), released November 27, 1992
 Orkney Snork Nie 2, tagline "Nog 'n Movie" (translation: Another Movie), released December 24, 1993

Trivia
 Riekie was played by Bernice du Plessis, she is the daughter of Zack du Plessis (Hendrik).
 Anrich Herbst, Carien Wandrag and Rinus van Niekerk all attended Hoërskool Randburg.

External links
http://152.111.1.251/argief/berigte/dieburger/1989/04/25/8/2.html

1989 South African television series debuts
South African television sitcoms
Afrikaans-language television shows
South African Broadcasting Corporation television shows
Television shows set in South Africa
1980s South African television series
1992 South African television series endings